C. Saraswathi  is an Indian doctor turned politician and a Member of Tamil Nadu Legislative Assembly representing Modakkurichi. She belongs to the Bharatiya Janata Party.

Education 
She has qualified as a medical doctor passing the MBBS examination of Madras University in the year 1968. She also qualified with a Diploma in Child Health (DCH) at the same University in 1972.

Profession 
She is a medical doctor by profession. Together with her husband Chinnasamy, who is also a medical doctor, she owns C. K. Hospital at Erode. Therefore, sometimes, she is called as C. K. Saraswathi.

Legislative member 
She contested the 2021 election for Tamil Nadu Legislative Assembly from the Modakkurichi (state assembly constituency) in the district of Erode, and won against the DMK's former minister Subbulakshmi Jagadeesan, with a margin of 281 votes.

References

External links 
 - Opening of her hospital (C K Hospitals)

Living people
Bharatiya Janata Party politicians from Tamil Nadu
Tamil Nadu MLAs 2021–2026
People from Erode district
1945 births